Mark West may refer to:

Places in the United States
 Mark West, California, an unincorporated community in Sonoma County
 Mark West Creek, a stream in Sonoma County
 Mark West Springs, California, an unincorporated area in Sonoma County

People
 Mark West (basketball) (born 1960), American basketball player
 Mark West (footballer) (born 1973), Australian footballer
 William Marcus West, Scottish American pioneer noted in Sonoma County, California, USA 
 Mark D. West (born 1968), legal scholar

West, Mark